The 1984 Eccles rail crash occurred on 4 December 1984 at Eccles, Greater Manchester, when an express passenger train collided at speed with the rear of a freight train of oil tankers. The driver of the express and two passengers were killed, and 68 people were injured.  The cause of the accident was determined to be that the driver of the express train had passed a signal at danger.

The accident 
The passenger train involved was 1E79, the 10:05 service from Liverpool to Scarborough, formed of a Class 45 diesel locomotive  No.45147, seven passenger coaches and a parcels van.   The freight train was 6E85, the 09:00 service from Stanlow Oil Refinery, Ellesmere Port to Leeds, composed of a Class 47 locomotive No.47310 and fifteen tanker wagons containing fuel oil.

The freight train had just passed Eccles station and was starting to accelerate away when the passenger train, having passed both the Eccles distant signal at caution and home signal at danger, collided heavily with its rear. It was estimated that the freight train was travelling at about 10 mph, whilst the passenger train's speed was between 45 and 50 mph.

The force of the collision threw the rearmost tanker to the side, but the next two wagons were thrown into the air, with one falling back onto the passenger locomotive. The wagons were badly damaged and escaping fuel oil was ignited by the hot exhaust gases of the locomotive, setting fire to it and the leading two coaches.  Fortunately, the leading coach was empty of passengers or the death toll would probably have been much higher. However, the express driver and one passenger were killed instantly, whilst another passenger succumbed to injuries a month later. A number of people received impact injuries and burns and many were also treated for smoke inhalation. Rescue efforts were assisted by the location of the accident, which was adjacent to the M602 motorway, enabling easy access for emergency services.

The inquiry 
The inquiry into the accident was inconclusive.  There had been problems with the signalling in the area, and track circuits had been affected by a maintenance gang working on the track nearby, but the inspector was satisfied that the signals which had been passed at danger were working properly and showing the correct aspects. They were, however, not fitted with the AWS warning system to alert the driver to his error. In the absence of any conflicting medical evidence, the inquiry was forced to conclude that the driver had simply allowed his attention to wander and had missed the Eccles signals – it was testified by staff that it was rare for these signals to be at danger.

The report recommended that these signals be fitted with AWS, work which was quickly completed. The home signal was also fitted with a white backplate, in order to make it more visible against the road bridge that stands behind it.

References 

Eccles rail crash, 1984
Eccles rail crash
Eccles rail crash
Eccles, Greater Manchester
Eccles rail crash, 1984
Railway accidents involving a signal passed at danger
Eccles rail crash, 1984
Eccles rail crash
Train collisions in England
1984 disasters in the United Kingdom
Rail accidents caused by a driver's error